Civil courage is a type of courage, related closely to heroism, in which a person acts bravely to intervene or take a stand in a social situation. Civil courage is defined as: Courage shown by a person by representing human and democratic values (e.g., human dignity, justice, helping people in need) in public (e.g., towards authorities, superiors, strangers or perpetrators, regardless of possible personal social and physical consequences).

Overview
Italian journalist and writer  (1925–1996) wrote, "Je mehr Bürger mit Zivilcourage ein Land hat, desto weniger Helden wird es einmal brauchen" ("The more citizens with civil courage a country has, the fewer heroes it needs").

Contemporary use 

Civil courage has been referred to by psychologist Tobias Greitemeyer as constituting acts of bravery, carried out with the objective of enforcing a societal or ethical standard, without concern for the effect these acts might have on one's own position. This is because this civil courage is often punished since it entails risks and almost ensures ostracism not only from a group that the courageous individual belongs but also from society. In this way, it is distinguished from altruistic behavior and other forms of courage.

In the case of altruistic, helping behavior, an individual might expect to be praised or receive positive social consequences from the result of their having helped, despite possible financial or material loss. In actions where civil courage is demonstrated, the person carrying out the action may experience negative social consequences such as alienation, verbal abuse or violence. Civil courage is displayed when a person, in spite of the perceived threat of negative consequences acts to intervene in a social context. This is demonstrated in the case of whistleblowers, who do not necessarily risk their lives but their action could lead to years in prison.

There are those who associate civil courage to the concept of non-violence attributed to Mahatma Gandhi and Martin Luther King Jr. and cited such association as the cause why it faded as a model of conduct due to the perception that it is uninteresting and boring.

Learning civil courage 
A study from 2021 showed that German citizens consider the following contexts relevant to learn civil courage: “at home and/or from family”, “through volunteering”, “in sports organizations”, “in extracurricular activities”, “in school”, “in professional organizations”, “from friends”, and “in youth movements”. The following contexts are not considered relevant: “from television”, “from social media”, and “from the internet”.

See also 
 Dietrich Bonhoeffer

References 

Courage
Virtue
Philosophy of love
Civil society